Jonathan Street (9 February 1943 – 1 November 2012) was a British novelist. He won the Somerset Maugham Award for his novel Prudence Dictates (1972). Among his other books are Yours (1970) and Rebarbative! (1969).

Street was also a respected public relations executive specialising in the field of healthcare.

Street died in 2012 after a fall. He was survived by his wife Susan Castillo.

References

External links 
The Somerset Maugham Award (The Society of Authors)

People educated at Tonbridge School
1942 births
2012 deaths
British male novelists
20th-century British novelists
20th-century British male writers